Roxane Fournier (born 7 November 1991) is a French racing cyclist, who currently rides for UCI Women's WorldTeam .

Major results

Road

2008
 3rd Cergy Criterium 
2009
 1st Stage 4 Junior Omloop van Borsele
 National Junior Road Championships
2nd Road race
3rd Time trial
2012
 1st Wanze Road Race
 1st Stage 3 Tour de Bretagne Féminin
 5th Road race, UEC European Under-23 Road Championships
2013
 1st Stage 4 Tour de Bretagne Féminin
2014
 1st Stage 1 Trophée d'Or Féminin
 4th Overall Tour of Chongming Island
 5th Grand Prix de Dottignies
 10th La Course by Le Tour de France
2015
 1st Grand Prix de Dottignies
 1st Stage 1 Tour Cycliste Féminin International de l'Ardèche
 2nd Overall Tour of Chongming Island
1st Stage 3
 4th La Madrid Challenge by La Vuelta
 9th Tour of Chongming Island World Cup
2016
 La Route de France
1st Stages 2 & 7
 1st Stage 3 Tour of Zhoushan Island
 2nd SwissEver GP Cham-Hagendorn
 3rd Grand Prix de Dottignies
 5th Overall Tour of Chongming Island
 5th La Course by Le Tour de France
 6th Road race, UCI Road World Championships
 9th Madrid Challenge by La Vuelta
 10th Le Samyn des Dames
2017
 3rd Madrid Challenge by La Vuelta
 4th Road race, UEC European Road Championships
 4th Pajot Hills Classic
 4th Trofee Maarten Wynants
 6th Omloop van het Hageland
 8th Prudential RideLondon Classique
2018
 2nd Grand Prix International d'Isbergues
 4th Drentse Acht van Westerveld
 6th Omloop van het Hageland
 7th Gran Premio Bruno Beghelli Internazionale Donne Elite
 8th Ronde van Drenthe
 9th Le Samyn des Dames
2019
 4th Omloop van het Hageland
 4th Clasica Femenina Navarra
 6th Vuelta a la Comunitat Valenciana Feminas
 10th Nokere Koerse
2021
 10th Dwars door het Hageland

Track

2009
 National Junior Track Championships
1st  Individual pursuit
2nd Points race
 3rd  Scratch, UEC European Junior Track Championships
2010
 3rd Points race, National Track Championships
2013
 National Track Championships
1st  Team sprint
2nd Scratch
2014
 1st  Team pursuit, National Track Championships
2015
 1st  Team pursuit, National Track Championships
 3rd  Scratch, UEC European Track Championships
2016
 National Track Championships
1st  Scratch
1st  Team pursuit
 Fenioux France Trophy
2nd Scratch
3rd Points race

References

External links

Living people
1991 births
People from Soisy-sous-Montmorency
French female cyclists
European Games competitors for France
Cyclists at the 2019 European Games
Sportspeople from Val-d'Oise
Cyclists from Île-de-France
21st-century French women